Hessische Geschichten is a German television series.

See also
List of German television series

External links
 

1986 German television series debuts
1994 German television series endings
Television shows set in Hesse
German-language television shows
ZDF original programming